Currais Novos is a municipality in the state of Rio Grande do Norte in the Northeast region of Brazil. As of 2020, the population was estimated at 44,905.

Prominent people
 Vicente de Lima (b. 1977), Olympic sprinter

See also
List of municipalities in Rio Grande do Norte
Apertados Canyon

References

Municipalities in Rio Grande do Norte